Euseius nyalensis is a species of mite in the family Phytoseiidae.

References

nyalensis
Articles created by Qbugbot
Animals described in 1968